Acid Rain is the third compilation album by Esham. Released in 2002, it is the first of three albums by the rapper released on Psychopathic Records, followed by the studio albums Repentance and A-1 Yola. It is known as the "Esham Story".

Track listing

References

2002 greatest hits albums
Albums produced by Esham
Esham compilation albums
Psychopathic Records compilation albums